The 2002 South Lakeland District Council election took place on 2 May 2002 to elect members of South Lakeland District Council in Cumbria, England. One third of the council was up for election and the council stayed under no overall control.

After the election, the composition of the council was:
Liberal Democrat 21
Conservative 19
Labour 9
Independent 3

Background
Before the election the Liberal Democrats were the largest group on the council, but no party had a majority. 14 of the seats being contested were in Kendal, with the Liberal Democrats defending 9 of the 18 seats which were up for election. 3 councillors stood down at the election, Liberal Democrat John Sudholme of Kendal Castle ward, Labour's Jim Blamire of Kendal Underley and independent Philip Ball of Kendal Oxenholme.

Issues in the election included plans to move council housing from the direct control of the council, with Labour opposing the move and both the Conservatives and Liberal Democrats supporting it. Other issues included improving the council finances, increasing recycling, parking and social exclusion.

Election result
The results saw little change in the party balance on the council, with the only net change being the Conservatives going up by 1 seat to 19 councillors, at the expense of the independents, who dropped to 3 seats. Close results came in Kendal Nether, where Labour gained a seat from the Liberal Democrats by 7 votes after a recount, and Kendal Highgate, where the Liberal Democrats took a seat from Labour by 13 votes.

One Independent candidate was unopposed.

Ward results

References

2002
2002 English local elections
2000s in Cumbria